Dream Corrosion is a 1994 live album by the British electronic musician Gary Numan. It was recorded at the London Hammersmith Apollo on 6 November 1993, and was originally released under the Numa Records label.

Track listing
All tracks written by Gary Numan except where noted.
All timings are approximate and will vary slightly with different equipment.

1994 Numa LP, MC and CD release (NUMA/C/CD 1010)
Disc one
"Mission (Intro)" – 2:17
"Machine and Soul" – 6:16
"Outland" – 4:09
"Me! I Disconnect From You" – 3:14
"We Are So Fragile" – 3:02
"Respect" – 4:12
"Shame" (Numan/Beggs) – 4:32
"Films" – 5:16
"Dream Killer" – 4:42
"Down in the Park" – 6:12
"My World Storm" – 5:11
"The Machman" – 3:43
"Generator" (Numan/Kipper) – 5:25
"Noise Noise" – 4:21

Disc two
"Cars" – 5:16
"Voix" – 5:34
"You Are in My Vision" – 3:41
"It Must Have Been Years" – 4:32
"That's Too Bad" – 3:41
"Remind Me To Smile" – 3:50
"I'm An Agent" – 4:44
"Are 'Friends' Electric?" – 7:06
"My Breathing" – 7:10
"I Don't Believe" – 4:36
"Bombers" – 4:46
"Jo The Waiter" – 6:32
"We Are Glass" – 5:59

 Track listing applies to the CD release.

2003 Eagle Records CD reissue (EDMCD 160)
Same CD track listing as Numa release. Different front, rear and inner tray artwork and an essay by Dominic Jones.

Personnel
 Gary Numan – vocals, guitar, producer, mixer
 Richard Beasley – drums
 Ade Orange – keyboards, bass
 John Webb – keyboards, saxophone
 Kipper – guitars, backing vocals
 T.J. Davies – backing vocals
 NuFederation – sleeve design

References

1993 live albums
Gary Numan live albums